Maghaberry or Magaberry (pronounced) is a village and townland in County Antrim, Northern Ireland. In the 2011 Census it had a population of 4,716 people. It is one of the biggest villages within the Lisburn and Castlereagh City Council area.

History
Until the early 20th century, Maghaberry was a rural townland with a crossroads, on the edge of a plateau. The economy of the area was mainly farming, although there were some limestone quarries. Today, the village serves as a commuter settlement, with its population mostly working and shopping elsewhere. It includes a community centre, Maghaberry Primary School, Maghaberry Methodist Church which is now a Covenant Church in partnership with the Church in Ireland. This new covenant arrangement amalgamates the two congregation into one. The new Covenant church is now known as the "Church on the Hill" and is led by two ministers The Reverend Robert Loney Superintendent minister of the Glenavy/Moira Circuit of the Methodist church in Ireland and the Reverend Carlton Baxter a minister of the Church of Ireland, Elim Tabernacle, a village hall and shops.

Places of interest 
HMP Maghaberry is a modern high security prison housing adult male long term sentenced and remand prisoners, in both separated and integrated conditions. There are 939 staff and room for 718 prisoners in single cell accommodation.

2011 Census 
On Census day in 2011, there were 4,716 people living in Maghaberry in 1,656 households. Of these:
23.2% were aged under 16 years and 11.22% were aged 60 and over.
50.59% of the population were male and 49.41% were female.
11.05% were from a Catholic background and 80.96% were from a Protestant or any other Christian background.
74.81% indicated they had a British national identity, 7.4% had an Irish national identity and 33.18% had a Northern Irish national identity.
2.22% of people aged 16–74 were unemployed.

Notes

References 

NI prison Service - Maghaberry
Draft Belfast Metropolitan Area Plan 2015

Villages in County Antrim